The 1982–83 WHL season was the 17th season for the Western Hockey League.  Fourteen teams completed a 72-game season.  The Lethbridge Broncos won the President's Cup while the host Portland Winter Hawks became the first American team to win the Memorial Cup.

League notes
The Billings Bighorns relocated to Nanaimo, British Columbia to become the Nanaimo Islanders.
Two expansion teams joined the WHL: the Prince Albert Raiders and Kelowna Wings.

Regular season

Final standings

Scoring leaders
Note: GP = Games played; G = Goals; A = Assists; Pts = Points; PIM = Penalties in minutes

1983 WHL Playoffs

First round
Saskatoon earned a bye
Regina earned a bye
Calgary defeated Medicine Hat 3 games to 2
Lethbridge defeated Winnipeg 3 games to 0

Division semi-finals
Calgary defeated Regina 4 games to 1
Lethbridge defeated Saskatoon 4 games to 2
Portland defeated Seattle 4 games to 0
Victoria defeated Kamloops 4 games to 3

Division finals
Lethbridge defeated Calgary 4 games to 2
Portland defeated Victoria 4 games to 1

WHL Championship
Lethbridge defeated Portland 4 games to 1

All-Star game

There was no All-Star Game in 1982–83.

WHL awards

All-Star Teams

See also
1983 Memorial Cup
1983 NHL Entry Draft
1982 in sports
1983 in sports

References
whl.ca
 2005–06 WHL Guide

Western Hockey League seasons
WHL
WHL